Starlet is a 2012 independent drama film directed by Sean Baker and starring Dree Hemingway and newcomer Besedka Johnson. Starlet explores the unlikely friendship between 21-year-old Jane and 85-year-old Sadie, two women whose lives intersect in California's San Fernando Valley.

Plot

Jane, also known as Tess, is a young woman who shares an apartment rented by Melissa and her boyfriend Mikey. Jane has a Chihuahua named Starlet.

Melissa tells Jane she cannot change the color of her room as she wishes because Mikey needs it for "shoots". Seeking change, Jane buys furniture at neighborhood yard sales. At one such sale she comes across an old woman named Sadie, from whom she buys a Thermos.

Back at her place, Jane discovers a stash of money in the Thermos. She spends some of it on extravagant luxuries, but decides to return the money to Sadie. The cranky older woman turns Jane away before she can explain. Despite Sadie's abrasiveness and resistance, Jane begins to form a friendship with her. She learns that the widow Sadie always loved Paris but has never been there. When Jane asks about her family, Sadie answers that she was married to a successful gambler, became a widow long ago and never had children. Jane becomes very attached to Sadie.

After an argument with her boss, Melissa is fired from her job where she, Mikey, and Jane are adult film stars. Jane convinces their boss to suspend Melissa for a month instead. Jane gets a promotion. Melissa's car is repossessed, but she gets it back from money doing "privates". One day, Jane leaves her dog Starlet with Sadie while she works at a porn convention. The dog gets loose and, although Sadie finds Starlet, she suggests ending the friendship with Jane.

Jane still has most of the money she found in the Thermos. When very drunk, Melissa advises her to spend it on "someone you care about," expecting that it would be spent on Melissa herself, as she reveals later. Jane buys two first-class tickets to Paris to take Sadie there, but Sadie refuses to go, before eventually agreeing to go on the trip. When Melissa learns that Jane spent all the money on Sadie, she is enraged. Melissa screams at Jane and kicks her out of the apartment. Jane contacts their boss, who provides her a room in a large house which serves as a dormitory for a stable of porn actresses.

In an act of revenge or as a way of feeling morally superior, Melissa tells Sadie about the stash of money. Sadie briefly unpacks her suitcase, but stops and gets ready to travel. Later, Jane, not knowing that Sadie has been told about the money, picks her up to go to the airport.

Sadie asks Jane to stop at the cemetery to leave flowers on her husband's grave. Jane notices the nearby grave of Sadie's daughter who died around age 18. She returns to the car, and the two drive away.

Cast
 Dree Hemingway as Jane / Tess
 Besedka Johnson as Sadie
 Stella Maeve as Melissa
 James Ransone as Mikey
 Karren Karagulian as Arash
 Michael Adrienne O'Hagan as Janice
 Asa Akira as herself
 Manuel Ferrara as himself
 Lily Labeau as herself
 Kristina Rose as herself
 Zoe Voss as Jane / Tess's Body Double

Production
Sean Baker and Chris Bergoch collaborated on the screenplay for Starlet from November 2010 through summer 2011. Starlet began production in August 2011 and wrapped the following month. The film was shot entirely in Los Angeles. The budget was reportedly $235,000.

Release
Starlet premiered at the SXSW Film Festival on March 11, 2012 and had its international premiere in main competition at the Locarno International Film Festival in August 2012. It was released theatrically by Music Box Films on November 9, 2012.

Reception
Rotten Tomatoes, a review aggregator, reports that 87% of 45 surveyed critics gave the film a positive review; the average rating was 7.3/10. Metacritic rated it 74/100 based on 18 reviews.  Indiewire called Starlet a "provocative showcase for newcomer Dree Hemingway", and Variety called it "beautifully understated". The Hollywood Reporter added that it "pairs story and setting together perfectly". Movieline wrote that the film was "surprisingly sweet". Indiewire's blog The Playlist wrote that the film "signals the arrival of Dree Hemingway as one to watch".  Manohla Dargis of The New York Times made it a "critic's pick" and described it as "a thrillingly, unexpectedly good American movie about love and a moral awakening".

Accolades 
The film won the Independent Spirit Robert Altman Award for Best Ensemble Cast at the 2013 Film Independent Spirit Awards. Besedka Johnson received Special Jury Recognition at the South by Southwest Film Festival.

References

External links 
 
 
 
 

2012 films
2010s erotic drama films
American erotic drama films
American independent films
Films about pornography
2012 independent films
Films directed by Sean Baker
Films set in the San Fernando Valley
2012 drama films
2010s English-language films
2010s American films